Ship Cove-Lower Cove-Jerry's Nose is a local service district and designated place in the Canadian province of Newfoundland and Labrador.

History 
From the 1970s to present a major limestone quarry began operating at Lower Cove employing 30-40 people.

Geography 
Ship Cove-Lower Cove-Jerry's Nose is in Newfoundland within Subdivision E of Division No. 4. It is west of Stephenville along the southern coastline of the Port au Port Peninsula on Route 460. It consists of the three adjacent unincorporated fishing communities of Ship Cove, Lower Cove and Jerry's Nose.

Demographics 

Government 
Ship Cove-Lower Cove-Jerry's Nose is a local service district (LSD) that is governed by a committee responsible for the provision of certain services to the community. The chair of the LSD committee is Andrew Campbell.

See also 
List of communities in Newfoundland and Labrador
List of designated places in Newfoundland and Labrador
List of local service districts in Newfoundland and Labrador

References 

Designated places in Newfoundland and Labrador
Local service districts in Newfoundland and Labrador